Alba Adriatica is a town and comune with 12,386 residents (2014) in the province of Teramo in the Abruzzo region of central eastern Italy.

It is known as one of the "seven sisters" of the northern Abruzzo coast, i.e. the seven coastal towns in the province of Teramo, the other six being (from north to south) Martinsicuro, Tortoreto, Giulianova, Roseto degli Abruzzi, Silvi Marina and Pineto.

It is also nicknamed Spiaggia d'argento (Silver Beach) because of the high quality standard of its beach, which earned the town the European Blue Flag in years from 2000 to 2013.

The comune of Alba Adriatica was created in 1956 by splitting it off from Tortoreto.

People
Aldo Zilli, chef
Ivan Palazzese, motorcycle road rider
Eugenio Calvarese, footballer

References

Cities and towns in Abruzzo